Yun Il-lok (born 7 March 1992) is a South Korean professional footballer who plays for Ulsan Hyundai in the South Korean K League 1. He has played for a number of youth-level teams representing South Korea, and in 2013 graduated to his country's senior men's side, winning the EAFF E-1 Football Championship in 2017 and 2019 as well as gold medal at the 2014 Asian Games.

Club career
Yun entered professional football as a teenager, being selected by Gyeongnam FC as part of their squad for the 2011 season, having spent his youth career with Gyeongnam's U-18 side.  His professional debut came almost immediately, in his club's second K-League match of the season against Ulsan, which ended in a 1–0 victory for Gyeongnam. Within a month, Yun scored his first K-League goal in Gyeongnam's 2–1 win over Incheon United.

In January 2020, following the expiry of his contract at Yokohama, Yun moved to Europe where he joined the French club Montpellier on a free transfer.

International career
Yun represented South Korea at the 2009 FIFA U-17 World Cup in Nigeria, playing all five matches as Korea progressed from the group stage to the quarterfinals.  There, the team's run came to an end against the host nation and eventual finalist.  Yun played a notable part in the round of 16 match against Mexico, when late in the second half his assist led to the equalising goal in the match, forcing extra time after which Korea won the subsequent penalty shootout.  Yun regards this assist as his most memorable moment in football.

Yun was also selected for the squad for the 2011 FIFA U-20 World Cup hosted by Colombia. After progressing through the group stages of the competition, Korea met Spain in the Round of 16 where they lost in a penalty shoot-out.  Yun played in all four matches of the tournament.  Yun was also called up for duty with the South Korea U-23 team, playing in a friendly against Uzbekistan in which he scored a goal as well as an Olympic Final Qualifier against Qatar in November 2011.

Yun has since graduated to the senior men's squad, scoring a goal in the EAFF East Asian Cup against Japan in his sides 2-1 loss on 28 July 2013.

Career statistics

Club

International 
Scores and results list South Korea's goal tally first, score column indicates score after each Yun goal.

Honours

Club 
FC Seoul
 Korean FA Cup: 2015
 K League 1: 2016

Ulsan Hyundai
 K League 1: 2022

International
South Korea U23
 Asian Games: 2014

South Korea
 EAFF E-1 Football Championship: 2017, 2019

References

External links
Profile at Yokohama F. Marinos 

Yun Il-lok – National Team Stats at KFA 

1992 births
Living people
Sportspeople from Gwangju
Association football wingers
South Korean expatriate footballers
South Korean footballers
Gyeongnam FC players
FC Seoul players
Yokohama F. Marinos players
Jeju United FC players
Montpellier HSC players
Ulsan Hyundai FC players
K League 1 players
J1 League players
Ligue 1 players
Footballers at the 2014 Asian Games
Asian Games medalists in football
Asian Games gold medalists for South Korea
Medalists at the 2014 Asian Games
South Korea under-20 international footballers
South Korea under-23 international footballers
South Korea international footballers
South Korean expatriate sportspeople in Japan
Expatriate footballers in Japan
South Korean expatriate sportspeople in France
Expatriate footballers in France